National School of Drama, Varanasi is a new extension center of National School of Drama, New Delhi, established in 2018 to provide one year training on Indian Classical Theatre and Natyashashtra. It is an autonomous institution under the Ministry of Culture, Government of India.

Course 
The center only accepts students from India for a one-year residential training on Indian Classical Theatre and Natyashashtra.

Plays Curated 

 Svapnavasavadattam
 Satyavadi Raja Harish Chandra
 Bhagwadajjukam
 Abhijjan Shakuntalam
 Abhijjan Shakuntalam
 Rang Sangeet

Festivals 

 Rang Kashi
 Bharat Rang Mahotsav
 Benaras Rang Mohatsav

Repertory 
Dedicated to the tradition of natya shastra, the National School of Drama has setup a Repertory Varanasi centre, a one-of-its-kind, the center in 2018.

See also 

 Education in India
 Education in Varanasi
 National School of Drama

References

External links 

 Official NSD VARANASI (National School of Drama, Varanasi) website

National School of Drama
Drama schools in India
Film schools in India
Arts organizations established in 2018
Educational institutions established in 2018
Performing arts education in India
Theatre in India
Universities and colleges in Varanasi
Colleges in Uttar Pradesh